East Peak may refer to:
 East Peak (Douglas County, Nevada), highest point in Douglas County, Nevada
 East Peak (Elko County, Nevada)
 East Peak, former name of Wright Place, California
 East Peak (New Haven County, Connecticut)
 East Peak in Silver Bow County, Montana
 East Spanish Peak, one of the Spanish Peaks in Huerfano County, Colorado